Gilroy Takudzwa Chimwemwe (born 26 October 1992) is a Zimbabwean footballer who plays as a right back for Nkana and the Zimbabwe national team.

Club career
Born in Harare, Chimwemwe grew up in Dsivaresekwa before earning a scholarship to Pamushana High School in Masvingo Province. He started his career at Twalumba, where he scored 18 goals in the 2013 ZIFA Northern Region Division One.

Subsequently, he signed for Zimbabwe Premier Soccer League club Harare City in February 2014. He was signed as a central midfielder but made his full debut for the club at right back due to an injury crisis at the club, which led to Chimwemwe adopting the right back role permanently.

He moved to Zambia Super League club Buildcon in January 2020. He transferred to fellow Zambian club Nkana on 30 January 2021, alongside fellow Zimbabwean player Kelvin Moyo.

International career
Chimwemwe was called up to the Zimbabwe national under-23 team for the first time in November 2014 for a fixture against Morocco, which he played in.

He was also called up to the Zimbabwe national team for a fixture against Malawi in October 2020, which was drawn 0–0 with Chimwemwe playing the full 90 minutes. He played in 2 matches of the 2021 Africa Cup of Nations qualification, from which Zimbabwe qualified. He was named in Zimbabwe's squad for the tournament, which will be held in January and February 2022.

References

External links

1992 births
Living people
Zimbabwean footballers
Zimbabwe international footballers
People from Harare
Association football fullbacks
Harare City F.C. players
Buildcon F.C. players
Nkana F.C. players
Zambia Super League players
Zimbabwe Premier Soccer League players
Zimbabwean expatriate footballers
Zimbabwean expatriate sportspeople in Zambia
Expatriate footballers in Zambia
2021 Africa Cup of Nations players